Miriam Elitsavet Ramón Duran (born February 10, 1973) is a retired female athlete from Ecuador, who competed in the race walking events.

Career
She represented her native country at the 1992 Summer Olympics.

Achievements

References

External links

1973 births
Living people
People from Cuenca, Ecuador
Ecuadorian female racewalkers
Olympic athletes of Ecuador
Athletes (track and field) at the 1992 Summer Olympics
Pan American Games medalists in athletics (track and field)
Athletes (track and field) at the 1995 Pan American Games
Athletes (track and field) at the 2007 Pan American Games
World Athletics Championships athletes for Ecuador
Pan American Games silver medalists for Ecuador
South American Games bronze medalists for Ecuador
South American Games medalists in athletics
Competitors at the 1998 South American Games
Medalists at the 2007 Pan American Games
21st-century Ecuadorian women
20th-century Ecuadorian women